Frédéric François-Marsal (16 March 1874 – 20 May 1958) was a French Politician of the Third Republic, who served briefly as Prime Minister in 1924. Due to his premiership he also served for two days (11–13 June 1924) as the Acting President of the French Republic between the resignation of Alexandre Millerand and the election of Gaston Doumergue.

François-Marsal's Ministry, 8–15 June 1924
Frédéric François-Marsal- President of the Council and Minister of Finance
Edmond Lefebvre du Prey - Minister of Foreign Affairs
André Maginot - Minister of War
Justin de Selves - Minister of the Interior
Paul Jourdain - Minister of Labour and Hygiene
Antony Ratier - Minister of Justice
Désiré Ferry - Minister of Marine
Adolphe Landry - Minister of Public Instruction, Fine Arts, and Technical Education
Joseph Capus - Minister of Agriculture
Jean Fabry - Minister of Colonies
Yves Le Trocquer - Minister of Public Works, Ports, and Marine
Pierre Étienne Flandin - Minister of Commerce, Industry, Posts, and Telegraphs
Louis Marin - Minister of Liberated Regions

References 

 https://www.economie.gouv.fr/caef/frederic-francois-marsal

1874 births
1958 deaths
20th-century heads of state of France
Politicians from Paris
Republican Federation politicians
Prime Ministers of France
French Ministers of Finance
French Senators of the Third Republic
Senators of Cantal